The Sichuan Basin, formerly transliterated as the Szechwan Basin, sometimes called the Red Basin, is a lowland region in southwestern China. It is surrounded by mountains on all sides and is drained by the upper Yangtze River and its tributaries. The basin is anchored by Chengdu, the capital of Sichuan province, in the west, and the direct-administered municipality of Chongqing in the east. Due to its relative flatness and fertile soils, it is able to support a population of more than 100 million. In addition to being a dominant geographical feature of the region, the Sichuan Basin also constitutes a cultural sphere that is distinguished by its own unique customs, cuisine and dialects. It is famous for its rice cultivation and is often considered the breadbasket of China. In the 21st century its industrial base is expanding with growth in the high-tech, aerospace, and petroleum industries.

Geography

The Sichuan Basin is an expansive  lowland region in China that is surrounded by upland regions and mountains. Much of the basin is covered in hilly terrain. The basin covers the eastern third of Sichuan Province and the western half of Chongqing Municipality.

The westernmost section of the Sichuan Basin is the Chengdu Plain, occupied by Chengdu, provincial capital of Sichuan. The Chengdu Plain is largely alluvial, formed by the Min River and other rivers fanning out when entering the basin from the northwest. This flat region is separated from the rest of the basin by the Longquan Mountains. The central portions of the Sichuan Basin are generally rolling, covered by low hills, eroded remnants of the uplifted Sichuan Basin floor. In some parts of the extreme northern Basin and in Weiyuan County in the southwest, there are ancient dome-shaped low mountains in their own right.

While population growth stagnated during the Great Leap Forward, it has since recovered. Today, the basin has a population of approximately 100 million.  Administratively, the entire basin was part of Sichuan province until Chongqing was separated into a provincial-level municipality in 1997. In addition to Chengdu and Chongqing, significant cities found within the Sichuan Basin include Guangyuan, Mianyang, Deyang, Nanchong, Guang'an, Dazhou, Ya'an, Meishan, Leshan, Ziyang, Suining, Neijiang, Zigong, Yibin, and Luzhou.  The former cities of Fuling and Wanzhou are now considered districts within Chongqing, but maintain their status as separate urban centres along the Yangtze.

Culture

Some unique elements of Sichuanese culture remain in the Basin.  Sichuanese cuisine today is renowned for its unique flavours and levels of spiciness.  The Sichuanese branch of Mandarin Chinese is barely mutually intelligible with Standard Mandarin and originated in the Sichuan Basin.  Today, Sichuanese is spoken throughout eastern Sichuan province, Chongqing, southern Shaanxi, and western Hubei.

Transportation

While transportation across the Sichuan Basin has been facilitated by relative flatness, access to and from the basin has long been a challenge. Chinese poet Li Bai once claimed that the road to Sichuan was "harder than the road to heaven". Until the construction of the Three Gorges Dam, the Yangtze River was the primary transportation corridor. Connecting the basin with the Yellow River valley to the north, the 4th century BCE Shu Roads were an engineering feat for their time. Most famously, the semi-legendary Stone Cattle Road is said to have been utilized by the Qin to first conquer the Sichuan Basin in 316 BC.

Transportation to the west from Sichuan has proven to be an even greater challenge, with steep mountains and deep valleys hindering movement. Nevertheless, the Sichuan Basin has played a role as a stopover on the southern Silk Road and provided the most direct route between India and China. The southern trade route to Tibet also passed through the basin, eventually crossing Kham and the Derge Kingdom to the west. The Long March passed to the west of Sichuan Basin in 1935 with great difficulty.

In the 20th century, the Sichuan Basin was connected to the rest of China by railways. The Chengyu Railway, completed in 1952, connected Chengdu and Chongqing within the basin.  The first rail link to outside the basin was the Baoji–Chengdu Railway, completed in 1961 to connect with Shaanxi province across the Qin Mountains to the north. The basin was also connected with Yunnan to the southwest in 1970, Hubei to the east in 1979, and Guizhou to the south in 2001. In the 21st century, many high-speed rail lines have been built or planned for the Sichuan Basin including the Chengdu-Guiyang and Chengdu-Xi'an lines.

Highway construction within Sichuan Basin intensified in the 21st century. Expressways through the basin include the G5, G42, G50, G65, G75, G76, G85, and G93. All expressways that connect the Sichuan Basin with other parts of China have been designed to utilize a series of tunnels and bridges to cross the mountainous surrounding terrain.

Maps gallery

See also

Sichuan
North China Plain

References

Landforms of Sichuan
Drainage basins of China
Regions of China